Amos 8 is the eighth chapter of the Book of Amos in the Hebrew Bible or the Old Testament of the Christian Bible. This book contains the prophecies attributed to the prophet Amos; in particular, the seventh, eighth, and ninth chapters contain visions and their explanations. It is a part of the Book of the Twelve Minor Prophets.

Text 
The original text was written in Hebrew language. This chapter is divided into 14 verses.

Textual witnesses
Some early manuscripts containing the text of this chapter in Hebrew are of the Masoretic Text tradition, which includes the Codex Cairensis (895), the Petersburg Codex of the Prophets (916), Aleppo Codex (10th century), Codex Leningradensis (1008).

Fragments containing parts of this chapter were found among the Dead Sea Scrolls including 4Q82 (4QXIIg; 25 BCE) with extant verses 1–5, 11–14;
 DSS F.Amos1 (DSS F.181; 1–30 CE) with extant verse 1; and Wadi Murabba'at (MurXII; 75–100 CE) with extant verses 3–7, 11–14.

There is also a translation into Koine Greek known as the Septuagint, made in the last few centuries BCE. Extant ancient manuscripts of the Septuagint version include Codex Vaticanus (B; B; 4th century), Codex Alexandrinus (A; A; 5th century) and Codex Marchalianus (Q; Q; 6th century).

Verse 8
 Shall not the land tremble for this,
 and every one mourn that dwelleth therein?
 and it shall rise up wholly as a flood;
 and it shall be cast out and drowned,
 as by the flood of Egypt.
 "cast out and drowned": "swept away and overwhelmed", as the land adjoining the Nile is by it, when flooding. The Nile rises generally twenty feet. The waters then "cast out" mire and dirt.

Verse 11
 Behold, the days come, saith the Lord God,
 that I will send a famine in the land,
 not a famine of bread, nor a thirst for water,
 but of hearing the words of the Lord:
 "Famine": When the light of God's revelation is withdrawn, the longing for the Word, will remain unsatisfied, like that of Saul, just like the psalmist grieves: "We see not our signs; there is no more any prophet; neither is there among us any that knoweth how long"; but it will be in vain (cf. ;).
 "Not a famine for bread": There could be both bodily and spiritual famine, such as stated, "the famine of the word of the Lord." Saul, in his extremity, "inquired of the Lord and He answered him not, neither by dreams, nor by Urim, nor by prophets" . Jeroboam sent his wife to inquire of the prophet Ahijah about his son's health. They sought for temporal relief only, and therefore found it not.
 "A thirst for water": the destruction by thirst is the most afflictive manner. Lysimachus is said to part with his kingdom for a draught of water; and the torments of hell are set forth by a violent thirst for it; but something worse than either of these is here threatened.
 "The words of the Lord": are the Scriptures, the word of prophecy, and the preaching of the word, or explaining the Scriptures. Hearing them signifies the preaching of them for by hearing comes a great blessing.

See also

Related Bible parts: Amos 2, Amos 7, Romans 1

Notes

References

Sources

External links

Jewish
Amos 8 Hebrew with Parallel English
Amos 8 Hebrew with Rashi's Commentary

Christian
Amos 8 English Translation with Parallel Latin Vulgate

08